For the music composer see Bert Peters (composer)

Albert Otto "Snowy" Peters (8 August 1908 – 13 June 1944) was an Australian rules footballer who played with North Melbourne in the Victorian Football League (VFL). He was nicknamed "Snow", "Snowie" or "Snowy", for his very thick straight fair hair.

Family
The son of Carl Erich Theodore Otto Peters (1872–1950), and Harriet Cordelia Peters (1874–1970), née Bond, Albert Otto Peters was born at St Arnaud, Victoria on 8 August 1908. Eric drove gold mine trains in St. Arnaud before and after serving in the Boer War. When Snowy was young Eric relocated his big family to Wonthaggi some 378 km to drive coal engines. Eric and Harriet are buried in Wonthaggi Cemetery.   

Bert married Ruby Anzac Kernot (1916–68) a fisherman's daughter of Tooradin in September 1939. She died in Queensland aged 52.

Football career
Bert was one of seven North Melbourne players to make their league debut in the opening round of the 1930 VFL season. By the end of the year he had played 12 games and he added another five in the 1931 season, which would be his last. In each of his 17 appearances for North Melbourne, Peters finished on the losing team. This included a 168-point loss to Richmond at Punt Road Oval. The 199 points conceded by North Melbourne in that game remained a league record until 1969.

Bert spent the remainder of his football career on the Mornington Peninsula. He captain-coached Mornington Peninsula Football League club Sorrento from 1938 to 1940 and led them to the finals in each of those years, including the 1940 grand final against victors Somerville-Baxter. Before coming to Sorrento, Peters played for Dromana District in 1937,. Prior clubs were Wonthaggi up to 1930 then again 1932-34 then Cranbourne (1935) and Hastings (1936).

Military service
Bert was working as a teacher in Red Hill South, Victoria when he enlisted with the Royal Australian Air Force in 1941. He came to England in June 1943 for operational training. His first posting was to the No. 455 Squadron RAAF and then the No. 53 Squadron RAF, which were based in Cornwall.

Death
On 13 June 1944, Peters was a navigator on board the No. 53 Squadron's B-24 Liberator BZ818/C which had been sent to the Bay of Biscay to perform an anti-submarine patrol. The plane was shot down by German submarine U-270, with all crew members killed.

Bert's body was never recovered. He is commemorated at the Air Forces Memorial, at Runnymede, and by a gumtree in Wonthaggi and on a plaque with his wife at All Saints Church Tooradin and another plaque in the Peace Garden at the Red Hill Consoldiation School organised by ex-pupil and later Shire of Flinders President, Keith Holmes.

See also
List of Victorian Football League players who died on active service

Footnotes

References
 R.A.A.F. Casualty List: Overseas: Missing Air Operations, The Age, (Tuesday, 18 July 1944), p.3.
 R.A.A.F. Casualty List: Overseas: Previously Reported Missing, Now Presumed Dead, The Age, (Friday, 19 June 1945), p.5.
 World War Two Service Record: Flying Officer Albert Otto Peters (408874), National Archives of Australia.
 World War Two Nominal Roll: Flying Officer Albert Otto Peters (408874), Department of Veteran's Affairs.
 Sportsmen's Honor Roll, The Weekly Times, (Saturday, 19 July 1941), p.40.
 Mickle, D.J., Tooradin: a history of a sportsman's paradise and the first 100 years of State School no. 1503, compiled by D.J. Mickle and the Tooradin "Back to" Committee, D.J Mickle, (Tooradin), 1975

External links

 
 

1908 births
1940s missing person cases
1944 deaths
Australian military personnel killed in World War II
Australian rules footballers from Victoria (Australia)
Missing in action of World War II
North Melbourne Football Club players
Royal Australian Air Force officers
Royal Australian Air Force personnel of World War II
Aviators killed by being shot down